Frederick William (16 February 1620 – 29 April 1688) was Elector of Brandenburg and Duke of Prussia, thus ruler of Brandenburg-Prussia, from 1640 until his death in 1688. A member of the House of Hohenzollern, he is popularly known as "the Great Elector" because of his military and political achievements. Frederick William was a staunch pillar of the Calvinist faith, associated with the rising commercial class. He saw the importance of trade and promoted it vigorously. His shrewd domestic reforms gave Prussia a strong position in the post-Westphalian political order of Northern-Central Europe, setting Prussia up for elevation from duchy to kingdom, achieved under his son and successor.

Biography

Elector Frederick William was born in Berlin to George William, Elector of Brandenburg, and Elisabeth Charlotte of the Palatinate. His inheritance consisted of the Margraviate of Brandenburg, the Duchy of Cleves, the County of Mark, and the Duchy of Prussia.

Owing to the disorder in Brandenburg during the Thirty Years' War, he spent part of his youth in the Netherlands, studying at Leiden University and learning something of war and statecraft under Frederick Henry, Prince of Orange. During his boyhood, a marriage had been suggested between him and Christina, heir to the throne of Sweden, but although the idea was revived during the peace negotiations between Sweden and Brandenburg, it came to nothing.

When his father died in 1640, Frederick inherited his titles.

Foreign diplomacy
Following the Thirty Years' War, which devastated much of the Holy Roman Empire, Frederick William focused on rebuilding his war-ravaged territories. Brandenburg-Prussia benefited from his policy of religious tolerance, and he used French subsidies to build up an army that took part in the 1655 to 1660 Second Northern War. This ended with the treaties of Labiau, Wehlau, Bromberg and Oliva; these changed the status of Ducal Prussia from that of a Polish fief to fully sovereign (after a brief period of control by Sweden), which meant he held it direct from the Holy Roman Emperor.

In 1672, Frederick William joined the Franco-Dutch War as an ally of the Dutch Republic, led by his nephew William of Orange but made peace with France in the June 1673 Treaty of Vossem. Although he rejoined the anti-French alliance in 1674, this left him diplomatically isolated; despite conquering much of Swedish Pomerania during the Scanian War, he was obliged to return most of it to Sweden in the 1679 Treaty of Saint-Germain-en-Laye. In 1666 his title to Cleves, Jülich and Ravensberg was definitely recognized.

Military career

Frederick William was a military commander of wide renown, and his standing army would later become the model for the Prussian Army. He is notable for his joint victory with Swedish forces at the Battle of Warsaw, which, according to Hajo Holborn, marked "the beginning of Prussian military history", but the Swedes turned on him at the behest of King Louis XIV and invaded Brandenburg. After marching 250 kilometres in 15 days back to Brandenburg, he caught the Swedes by surprise and managed to defeat them on the field at the Battle of Fehrbellin, destroying the myth of Swedish military invincibility. He later destroyed another Swedish army that invaded the Duchy of Prussia during the Great Sleigh Drive in 1678. He is noted for his use of broad directives and delegation of decision-making to his commanders, which would later become the basis for the German doctrine of Auftragstaktik, and for using rapid mobility to defeat his foes.

Domestic policies

Frederick William raised an army of 45,000 soldiers by 1678, through the General War Commissariat presided over by Joachim Friedrich von Blumenthal. He succeeded in his goal of centralizing the administration and increasing the revenue, and was an advocate of mercantilism, monopolies, subsidies, tariffs, and internal improvements. Following Louis XIV's revocation of the Edict of Nantes, Frederick William encouraged skilled French and Walloon Huguenots to emigrate to Brandenburg-Prussia with the Edict of Potsdam, bolstering the country's technical and industrial base. On Blumenthal's advice he agreed to exempt the nobility from taxes and in return they agreed to dissolve the Estates-General. He also simplified travel in Brandenburg and the Duchy of Prussia by connecting riverways with canals, a system that was expanded by later Prussian architects, such as Georg Steenke; the system is still in use today.

Legacy
In his half-century reign, 1640–1688, the Great Elector transformed the small remote state of Prussia into a great power by augmenting and integrating the Hohenzollern family possessions in northern Germany and Prussia.  When he became elector (ruler) of Brandenburg in 1640, the country was in ruins from the Thirty Years' War; it had lost half its population from war, disease and emigration. The capital Berlin had only 6,000 people left when the wars ended in 1648.  He united the multiple separate domains that his family had acquired primarily by marriage over the decades, and built the powerful unified state of Prussia out of them.  His success in rebuilding the lands and his astute military and diplomatic leadership propelled him into the ranks of the prominent rulers in an era of "absolutism". Historians compare him to his contemporaries such as Louis XIV of France (1643–1715), Peter the Great (1682–1725) of Russia, and Charles XI of Sweden (1660–1697).

Although a strict Calvinist who stood ready to form alliances against the Catholic states led by France's Louis XIV, he was tolerant of Catholics and Jews. He settled some 20,000 Huguenot refugees from France in his domains, which helped establish industry and trade, as did the foreign craftsmen he brought in. He established local governments in each province, headed by a governor and a chancellor, but they reported to his central government in Berlin. The Great Elector is most famous for building a strong standing army, with an elite officer corps. In 1668 he introduced the Prussian General Staff; it became the model in controlling an army for other European powers.   Funding the military through heavy taxes required building up new industry, such as wool, cotton, linen, lace, soap, paper, and iron.  He paid attention to infrastructure, especially building the Frederick William Canal through Berlin, linking his capital city to ocean traffic. He was frustrated in building up naval power, lacking ports and sailors. A learned man, he founded a university and established the Berlin library.

In 1682, at the suggestion of the Dutch merchant and privateer Benjamin Raule, he granted a charter to the Brandenburg Africa Company (BAC), marking the first organised and sustained attempt by a German state to take part in the Atlantic slave trade. As Brandenburg-Prussia remained economically impoverished after the Thirty Years War, he hoped to replicate the mercantile successes of the Dutch East India Company. The charter he granted to the BAC stipulated that they could establish a colony in West Africa, which was subsequently named the Brandenburger Gold Coast. Between 17,000 and 30,000 enslaved Africans were transported by the BAC to the Americas before the colony was sold to the Dutch in 1721. 

Significant ships named after Frederick William include two Imperial Navy ships of Germany named Grosser Kurfürst: one built in 1875 and the other built in 1913. Shipping company Norddeutscher Lloyd (aka North German Lloyd) also built a cargo and passenger liner for North Atlantic service with the same name that was later taken into US Navy service.

Marriages

On 7 December 1646 in The Hague, Frederick William entered into a marriage, proposed by Blumenthal as a partial solution to the Jülich-Berg question, with Luise Henriette of Nassau (1627–1667), daughter of Frederick Henry of Orange-Nassau and Amalia of Solms-Braunfels and his 1st cousin once removed through William the Silent. Their children were as follows:
 William Henry, Electoral Prince of Brandenburg (1648–1649)
 Charles, Electoral Prince of Brandenburg (1655–1674)
 Frederick I of Prussia (1657–1713), his successor
 Amalie (1664–1665)
 Henry (1664–1664)
 Louis (1666–1687), who married Ludwika Karolina Radziwiłł

On 13 June 1668 in Gröningen, Frederick William married Sophie Dorothea of Holstein-Sonderburg-Glücksburg, daughter of Philip, Duke of Schleswig-Holstein-Sonderburg-Glücksburg and Sophie Hedwig of Saxe-Lauenburg.
Their children were the following:
 Philip William (1669–1711)
 Marie Amelie (1670–1739)
 Albert Frederick (1672–1731)
 Charles Philip (1673–1695)
 Elisabeth Sofie (1674–1748)
 Dorothea (1675–1676)
 Christian Ludwig (1677–1734)

Frederick's later years were marked by differences between his wife and his son Frederick, and influenced by Dorothea he bequeathed portions of Brandenburg to her four sons. That bequest was annulled under his successor.

Ancestry

See also
German colonial projects before 1871#Brandenburg-Prussian colonies

References

Further reading
 Carsten, Francis L. "The Great Elector and the foundation of the Hohenzollern despotism." English Historical Review 65.255 (1950): 175–202. Online
 Carsten, Francis L. "The Great Elector" History Today (1960) 10#2 pp. 83–89.
 Clark, Christopher M.  Iron kingdom: the rise and downfall of Prussia, 1600–1947 (Harvard UP, 2006).
Citino, Robert. The German Way of War. From the Thirty Years War to the Third Reich (UP Kansas, 2005).
 Holborn, Hajo.  A History of Modern Germany: Vol 2: 1648–1840  (1982).
 McKay, Derek. The Great Elector: Frederick William of Brandenburg-Prussia (Routledge, 2018), standard scholarly biography
 Mühlbach, L. The reign of the Great Elector (1900) online free
 Richardson, Oliver H. "Religious Toleration under the Great Elector and Its Material Results." English Historical Review 25.97 (1910): 93–110 Online.
 Schevill, Ferdinand. The Great Elector (U of Chicago Press, 1947), outdated biography
 Wilson, Peter H. "The Great Elector. (Shorter Notices)." English Historical Review 117#472 (2002) pp. 714+. online review of McKay.
 Upton, George P. Youth of the Great Elector (1909)

External links

17th-century Dukes of Prussia
Dukes of Prussia
Electoral Princes of Brandenburg
People from Berlin
Prince-electors of Brandenburg
German Calvinist and Reformed Christians
House of Hohenzollern
Knights of the Garter
German people of the Thirty Years' War
Protestant monarchs
17th-century German people
1620 births
1688 deaths
German expatriates in the Dutch Republic
Brandenburgian nobility
Burials at Berlin Cathedral